Y11 may refer to:
 Y11 series, a car series of the Nissan Wingroad
 Gokokuji Station station number
 Harbin Y-11, a high wing twin-engine piston utility aircraft
 LNER Class Y11, a class of petrol powered 0-4-0 locomotives built by Motor Rail & Tram Car Company Limited
 Year Eleven, an educational year group in schools in many countries including England, Wales, Northern Ireland, Australia and New Zealand
 French Republican Calendar/Y11